E. plicata may refer to:
 Encyclia plicata, an orchid species
 Eupleura plicata, a sea snail species

See also
 Plicata (disambiguation)